The Makabayang Katipunan ng mga Pilipino (Patriotic Association of Filipinos), better known as the Makapili, was a militant group formed in the Philippines in December 8 1944 during World War II to give military aid to the Imperial Japanese Army. The group was meant to be on equal basis with the Japanese Army and its leaders were appointed with ranks that were equal to their Japanese counterparts.

Background 
The Japanese decreed that the group be founded in December 8, 1944 when they brought together many of the supporters of the defunct nationalist Ganap Party, which was an offshoot of the Sakdalistas or those who helped the Japanese in the recruitment of manpower as well as in the construction and maintenance of infrastructure. The move was meant to reverse the increasing activism of the Philippine resistance movement. Organized by Benigno Ramos and Artemio Ricarte, it was borne out of José P. Laurel's refusal to conscript Filipinos for Japan. An account cited that Laurel's objection was due to the way Makapili did not owe its allegiance to him or the republic. During its inauguration, Ramos described it as nonpolitical, nonpartisan, and nonsectarian organization that aims to destroy the nation's enemies. Members were given Japanese military training and became soldiers, spies, and saboteurs.

Operations 
Like Ganap, the Makapili's main area of support was Metro Manila, although it established chapters across the islands, attracting some support. In all, it attracted  to 6,000 members, many of them poor or landless farmers who came to the group due to vague promises of land reform after the war. They were armed with bayonets and bamboo spears but when the number of the Japanese puppet force grew, they were equipped with rifles. Makapili was not used to fight the American forces and was merely deployed to counter the recognized guerrilla and the Philippine Commonwealth military activity by anti-Japanese forces in rural areas. The group was also initially used as guards for Japanese and government facilities. The Japanese did not trust Makapili on its own so most of these were not assigned as separate detachments but were assigned to Japanese units.

After the war ended in 1945, the group was disbanded and vilified for its involvement in some of the Japanese atrocities in the islands. Individual members faced trials for treason as a result.

A 1951 film of the same name was made starring Justina David.

Legacy
The Makapili was strongly and extensively vilified by the Filipino people after the war. For example, post-WWII Filipino films portraying Makapili members typically show them wearing bayong (a woven basket made from leaves) with eye holes and pointing out people whom they suspect of being resistance sympathizers, then they are shown leaving the area while Japanese soldiers are now guarding the resistance sympathizers they pointed out.

See also
Hanjian
Chinilpa

References

Defunct organizations based in the Philippines
Filipino collaborators with Imperial Japan
Military history of the Philippines during World War II
Military units and formations established in 1944
Military units and formations disestablished in 1945
National liberation armies